Maria Aurora Couto (22 August 1937 – 14 January 2022) was an Indian writer and educator from Goa. She was best known for her book Goa: A Daughter's Story and for promoting literature and ideas within Goa and beyond. She lived in the north Goan village of Aldona. In addition to her books, she wrote for newspapers and magazine, and also taught English literature at Lady Shri Ram College, Delhi and Dhempe College of Panjim. She also helped start the DD Kosambi Festival of Ideas in 2008.

Couto was a recipient of the Padma Shri, India's fourth highest civilian award in 2010.

Early life
Couto was born in Salcette in South Goa on 22 August 1937 to António Caetano Francisco (Chico) de Figueiredo and Maria Quitéria Filomena Borges. Her parents were both natives of the Velhas Conquistas district of Salcette. Both her paternal and maternal origins were from the Roman Catholic Brahmin community of the erstwhile Portuguese Goa and Damaon. 

She moved as a child to the neighbouring city of Dharwad, then in the Mysore state, and a centre of education and opportunity for Goans, with her parents and six siblings in an attempt to control her father's alcoholism. Following their father's abandonment of the family, the seven children were raised by their mother as a single parent.

Couto studied at St Joseph's High School and later studied English literature at Karnatak University. In a later interview, she would later recollect that her growing up days were centered around her identity as an Indian, as a Goan, and as a Catholic. The college at the time had students from all over the then Mysore state. Some of her classmates at university included playwright Girish Karnad and author Shashi Deshpande. She later completed her PhD in literature studying religious humanism in the works of François Mauriac.

Career
Couto went on to teach English literature in colleges such as Lady Shri Ram College, Delhi and Dhempe College, Panaji and also contributed to periodicals in India and the United Kingdom.

Couto's writing career began with her 1988 book about English author and literary critic, Graham Greene's works, Graham Greene: On the Frontier, Politics and Religion in the Novels. She had met the writer earlier during his visit to Goa in 1963. Her 2004 book, Goa: A Daughter's Story, covers the history of Goa from her perspective in addition to being an autobiography. In 2014, Couto released her book Filomena's Journeys, which delves into the life of her mother, Filomena Borges, covering "Goa’s dying Catholic elite" as it showed the shift of society and culture in Goa. In this third book she described her father's battles with alcoholism, life in the changing times, and growing up in multicultural India. 

As the Chairperson of the DD Kosambi Centenary Committee in 2008, Couto helped initiate the DD Kosambi Festival of Ideas, a lecture series sponsored by Goa's Department of Culture. She was also actively involved with Goa University.

Couto also spoke about environmental issues and on various social justice causes pertaining to her home state of Goa. She spoke against the attacks and vandalism of Catholic crosses in Southern Goa in 2017. She was also a supporter of the Goenchi Mati Movement, a people's movement that protested the mining activities in Goa. Couto was amongst writers who asked the Sahitya Akademi to condemn actions including the M. M. Kalburgi killing and other violence in the country in 2015.

Couto was awarded the Padma Shri, India's fourth highest Indian civilian award, by the Government of India in 2010.

Personal life and death
Couto married an Indian civil administrator of Goan origin, Alban Couto (Albano Francisco Couto) in 1961. She moved along with her husband spending time in different parts of India, as well as abroad, and later returned to shape the literature of the region in her later years.

Her husband, belonged to the Indian Administrative Service. She met him in Mumbai and they had three children together. Due to the nature of his work, they would travel and stay across the country. They almost settled in Chennai, before finally choosing to live in Aldona, Goa, in his ancestral house. She enjoyed listening to South African jazz and was passionate about films, having started a film club when she was a teacher. Albano Couto died in June 2009.

Maria Couto died of pneumonia on 14 January 2022 at the age of 84.

Works
The works of Couto include: 
 
 
  (a translation of Etnografia da India Portuguesa by A.B. Braganza Pereira from Portuguese)

References

External links

 

1937 births
2022 deaths
20th-century Indian educational theorists
20th-century Indian historians
20th-century Indian novelists
20th-century Indian women writers
20th-century women educators
Educators from Goa
Goan Catholics
Indian Roman Catholics
Indian women educational theorists
Indian women historians
Indian women novelists
Novelists from Goa
People from North Goa district
Recipients of the Padma Shri in literature & education
Scholars from Goa
Women educators from Goa
Women writers from Goa